Wunna Kyawhtin Win Myint is a Burmese politician, businessman and former Minister for Commerce of Myanmar. He is also owner of the Shwe Nagar Min Company, Zeyashwemye Football Club and former chairman of the Union of Myanmar Federation of Chambers of Commerce and Industry (UMFCCI).

References

Government ministers of Myanmar
People from Sagaing Region
1954 births
Burmese businesspeople
Living people
Economy ministers
Recipients of the Wunna Kyawhtin